Major General Walter Pitts Hendy Hill,  (10 June 1877 – 1942) was a British Army officer who became colonel of the Royal Fusiliers.

Military career
Hill joined the Royal Fusiliers, where he was commissioned a second lieutenant on 18 October 1899. He served with the 2nd battalion in the Second Boer War in South Africa, where he was posted in Natal and Transvaal, taking part in engagements at Rooidam. He was promoted to lieutenant on 19 September 1900. He stayed in South Africa throughout the war, which ended with the Peace of Vereeniging in June 1902. Four months later he left Cape Town on the SS Salamis with other officers and men of the battalion, arriving at Southampton in late October, when the battalion was posted to Aldershot.

He served in the First World War as commander of a company of Gentlemen Cadets at the Royal Military College, Sandhurst from 1914, as a deputy assistant quartermaster general in France from 1915, as an assistant adjutant and quartermaster general in France from 1916 and as an assistant quartermaster general in France from 1917. He became assistant commandant and chief instructor at the School of Military Administration in 1920, commander of the 2nd Battalion the Loyal Regiment in 1922 and a general staff officer at the Staff College, Camberley in 1928. He went on to be brigadier in charge of administration at Northern Command in 1929, Brigadier in charge of administration at Eastern Command in 1931 and major general in charge of administration at Southern Command in 1934 before retiring in 1938. He also served as colonel of the Royal Fusiliers.

His son James Hill commanded 3rd Parachute Brigade during the Second World War.

References

External links
Generals of World War II

British Army major generals
1877 births
1942 deaths
British Army generals of World War II
Companions of the Order of the Bath
Companions of the Order of St Michael and St George
Companions of the Distinguished Service Order
British Army personnel of the Second Boer War
Royal Fusiliers officers
British Army personnel of World War I
Academics of the Staff College, Camberley
Academics of the Royal Military College, Sandhurst